Auriculariopsis is a fungal genus in the family Schizophyllaceae. The genus was described by mycologist René Maire in 1902. Auriculariopsis species have cup-shaped fruit bodies.

See also
List of Agaricales genera

References

Schizophyllaceae
Agaricales genera
Taxa named by René Maire
Taxa described in 1902